The Table is a 2016 South Korean drama film written and directed by Kim Jong-kwan. It stars Jung Yu-mi, Han Ye-ri, Jung Eun-chae and Im Soo-jung.

Plot
In a café in Seoul, seated at the same table from morning until evening, four different women engage in conversations exploring old and new relationships.
A successful actress and her ex-boyfriend, an office worker more interested in bragging about their connection to his colleagues; a man and a woman who had a one-night stand and awkwardly meet again after some time he spent abroad, trying to ascertain how important they are to one another; a woman about to be married and the older woman hired to play her mother at her wedding; a woman who asks her ex-boyfriend, who is still in love with her, to have a last fling before her marriage to a more "suitable" groom.

Cast
 Jung Yu-mi as Yu-jin 
 Han Ye-ri as Eun-hee
 Jung Eun-chae as Kyung-jin
 Im Soo-jung as Hye-gyeong
 Kim Hye-ok as Sook-hee
 Yeon Woo-jin as Woon-cheol
 Jung Jun-won as Chang-seok 
 Jeon Sung-woo as Min-ho

References

External links
 
 
 Review from Modern Korean Cinema, by Pierce Conran
 Hollywood Reporter review
 HanCinema review by William Schwarz
 Review at K-movie Love, by Yana Lekarska

2016 films
South Korean drama films
2016 drama films
Films directed by Kim Jong-kwan
2010s South Korean films